James Hugh Faulkner,  (March 9, 1933 – April 18, 2016) was a Canadian politician. He completed his BA at McGill University and his MBA at the International Management Institute (IMI) in Geneva, Switzerland.

Life and career
Faulkner was born in Montreal. A businessman by profession, Faulkner entered politics as the Liberal candidate in Peterborough, Ontario in the 1962 federal election. He came in third behind Progressive Conservative candidate Fred Stenson, and incumbent Walter Pitman of the New Democratic Party.

Faulkner again placed third behind Fred Stenson and Pitman in the 1963 federal election before prevailing in the 1965 election. In 1967 he represented Canada to the 22nd UN General Assembly and chaired the Labour and employment Committee of the House of Commons. He was re-elected in the 1968 election and was appointed Deputy Speaker of the House of Commons of Canada. In 1970, he was made parliamentary secretary to the Secretary of State for Canada.

Following the 1972 election, Faulkner was appointed to the Cabinet of Prime Minister Pierre Trudeau as Secretary of State.  Faulkner surprised political observers by handily defeating former Premier of Manitoba Dufferin Roblin who ran in Peterborough as a "star candidate" for the Progressive Conservative Party in the 1974 election.

In 1976, he was appointed to Minister of State for Science and Technology before becoming Minister of Indian Affairs and Northern Development in 1977. Faulkner continued in that position until his defeat in the 1979 election at the hands of Progressive Conservative Bill Domm.

After leaving politics, Faulkner joined Alcan as Vice President. In 1983 he was appointed Managing Director of all Alcan operations in India and Sri Lanka. In 1987 he was appointed President Alcan SA Europe. In 1990 he joined Swiss industrialist Stephan Schmiheiny to form the Business Council for Sustainable Development, Geneva. In 1995 he formed the development NGO Sustainable Project Management to undertake urban infrastructure projects in the developing world. In 1990 he bought the vineyard Domaine de Grand Cros, Provence, France which he and his family operate. He died in Chateau d'Oex, Switzerland after complications from surgery on April 18, 2016.

References

External links
 

1933 births
2016 deaths
Canadian Ministers of Indian Affairs and Northern Development
Liberal Party of Canada MPs
Members of the House of Commons of Canada from Ontario
Members of the King's Privy Council for Canada
McGill University alumni
Politicians from Montreal
Anglophone Quebec people